Athletic Club Port of Spain (previously known as North East Stars) is a Trinidad and Tobago professional football club, based in Port of Spain, Trinidad, that plays in the TT Pro League. The team plays its home games at Arima Velodrome.

History
The team joined the Professional Football League beginning in the 2002 season, having previously played in Trinidad's ECFU league.  The team joined the league with the explicit intention of representing the north-east of Trinidad, previously underrepresented in football circles.

The team was terrible in their first season, finishing last in the league with a dismal record of 4 wins, 2 ties, and 22 losses.  They improved dramatically in 2003, however, jumping from last to third, as they went 19–7–10.  They improved even further in 2004, surprising everyone by winning the league with a dominant 14–5–2 performance. They finished 5th in 2005.

The club's Jerren Nixon finished the 2004 season as the league's leading scorer with a staggering 31 goals, 17 in front of second place Randolph Jerome's 14.

In 2020, the club moved to Port of Spain and changed its name.

Club honours

League honours
 TT Pro League
 Champions (1): 2004
 Big Six Winners (1): 2004

Cups and trophies
 FA Trophy
 Winners (1): 2003.
 Runners-up (2): 2006, 2010–11.
 First Citizens Cup
 Runners-up (2): 2006,2016/2017 2014.
 TOYOTA Classic
 Winners (1): 2012.
 Runners-up (1): 2010.
 Lucozade Sport Goal Shield
 Winners (1): 2010.

Team management
Owner and President: Joe Pires 
Manager: Kevin Jeffrey
Head coach: Zoran Vranes
Goal keeper coach: Trevor Notthingham
Assistant coach: Kevin Jeffrey  
equipment Manager:  Selwyn Gabriel
physio therapist/ Trainer:  Oswin Birchwood 
massage-therapist: Earl Walters

Players

References

 
Football clubs in Trinidad and Tobago
2001 establishments in Trinidad and Tobago
Association football clubs established in 2001